Bowheyri (also Romanized as Bowḩeyrī; also known as Boheiri, Boḩeyrī, and Boveyrī) is a village in Markazi Rural District, in the Central District of Dashti County, Bushehr Province, Iran. At the 2006 census, its population was 944, in 206 families.

References 

Populated places in Dashti County